Orczy's Nicolette is a re-telling of the medieval French story Aucassin and Nicolette.

1922 British novels
Historical novels
Novels by Baroness Emma Orczy